The Trivial Pursuits of Arthur Banks is an American web series from AMC. It premiered in three sub-15 minute episodes on August 22, 2011. The series marked the first production for AMC's Digital Studios, which co-released the program through Hulu. It starred Adam Goldberg as the title character and Jeffrey Tambor as his psychiatrist.

The premise
Early in each episode, Arthur sits in a session with his therapist, rehashing his latest sexual encounter. Arthur is a successful playwright who is working to stage an elaborate play that mirrors his dysfunctional love life. Arthur has run-ins with barely legal teens, overemotional actors and surprise escorts. Aided by his therapist, and friend, Chandler Brown (Pete Chekvala), he attempts to navigate through this complex love life (and, accordingly, his on-stage meta-life).

Some scenes reference the film Deconstructing Harry.

The cast
Adam Goldberg as Arthur Banks
Jeffrey Tambor as The Therapist
Larry Pine as The Narrator
Pete Chekvala as Chandler Brown
Wendy Glenn as Annette
Laura Clery as Cornelia Klein
Fabianne Therese as Chloe
Camille Cregan as The Understudy
Barry Primus as George Epstein
Liesl Gaffney Dawson as Sophie

Episodes
Episode One: I Pulled A Polanski
Episode Two: The Silent Treatment
Episode Three: The Latent Existentialist

References

External links 
Official site for The Trivial Pursuits of Arthur Banks
"Annie Hall" meets "Manhattan" in Los Angeles review by Mike Hale of The New York Times
"The Trivial Pursuits of Arthur Banks" on IMDb
The Week In Culture review from The Huffington Post

2011 web series debuts
American comedy web series
2011 web series endings